is a Japanese footballer currently playing as a midfielder for Zweigen Kanazawa from 2023 on loan from FC Tokyo.

Career 
Kajiura begin first youth career with FC Tokyo until 2021, when he debut as professional career in J1 League for during 2021 season.

On 1 December 2022, Kajiura loan transfer to J2 club, Zweigen Kanazawa from 2023 season.

Career statistics

Club

.

Notes

References

External links

2004 births
Living people
Association football people from Tokyo
Japanese footballers
Japan youth international footballers
Association football midfielders
FC Tokyo players
Zweigen Kanazawa players